Wendy McMahon (born 1951 in Edmonton, Alberta) is a former Canadian politician, who was a BC Liberal Member of the Legislative Assembly of British Columbia from 2001 to 2005. She represented the riding of Columbia River-Revelstoke.

External links
Wendy McMahon

1951 births
Living people
British Columbia Liberal Party MLAs
Politicians from Edmonton
Women MLAs in British Columbia
21st-century Canadian politicians
21st-century Canadian women politicians
Women government ministers of Canada
Members of the Executive Council of British Columbia